CT1 stands for Cordless telephone generation 1 and is an analog cordless telephone standard that was standardized by the European Conference of Postal and Telecommunications Administrations (CEPT) in 1984 and deployed in eleven European countries.  The initial set of frequencies provided for a set 40 duplex channels using 25 kHz separation, with the phones transmitting in the 914-915 MHz band and the base stations in the 959-960 MHz band.  These frequencies overlap with those used by channels 120-124 on GSM cellular phones and thus these original frequencies have been withdrawn from use for cordless phones in the countries that originally authorized them.

CT1+ provided in 1987 for a set of 80 additional channels using the same technical standard with 885–887 MHz used by the phones and 930–932 MHz used by the base stations.  While not part of the original GSM-900 band, the frequencies do overlap with the extended GSM-900 band.  Thus between the advent of digital cordless telephones and the desire to free up spectrum for mobile telephones, these frequencies are being withdrawn for use as well.

CT0 is a term used for pre-CT1 analog cordless telephones that were deployed in a variety of countries with incompatible standards, mostly in the low VHF frequency range below broadcast Band I.

Since 31 December 2008, CTA1 and CTA2 based phones are forbidden in Germany.

See also
CT2 a digital cordless telephone standard that was the initial successor to CT1.

Telephony
Wireless communication systems